Sam Edwards (1915–2004) was an American actor.

Sam Edwards or Samuel Edwards may also refer to:

Samuel Edwards (1785–1850), U.S. representative from Pennsylvania
Samuel L. Edwards (1789–1877), New York politician
Samuel Edwards, a pseudonym of the American author Noel Gerson (1913–1988)
Sam Edwards (physicist) (1928–2015), British condensed-matter physicist
Sam Edwards (rugby league), New Zealand rugby league footballer
Samuel Jules Celestine Edwards, (late 1850s–1894), Dominican editor, public speaker, author, and anti-racist activist